Dominique is a 1950 French comedy film directed by Yvan Noé and starring Michel Barbey, Pierrette Caillol and Roger Monteaux. It was adapted by Noé from one of his own plays.

Cast
 Michel Barbey as Dominique Fougerolles  
 Claire Muriel as Simone Lambert  
 Roger Monteaux as Eugène Fougerolles  
 Pierrette Caillol as Germaine Fougerolles  
 Jean Témerson 
 Robert Moor as Oncle Charles  
 Henry Houry as Docteur Pinel  
 Marguerite Ducouret as Madame Rabaud  
 Lucien Callamand 
 Gustave Hamilton as Grandfather  
 Emma Lyonel as Tante Jeanne  
 Yvette Maurech as Maria  
 Sophie Mallet 
 George Khoury

References

Bibliography 
 Goble, Alan. The Complete Index to Literary Sources in Film. Walter de Gruyter, 1999.

External links 
 

1950 films
French comedy films
1950 comedy films
1950s French-language films
Films directed by Yvan Noé
French black-and-white films
1950s French films